LANCK Telecom is a global carrier of international phone calls that operates on the telecoms market providing call termination into local PSTN and mobile networks. As an international long-distance carrier (IXC) LANCK Telecom cooperates with telecommunications companies and telephone card providers worldwide.

LANCK Telecom has Points of Presence in major interconnection and data centers in Europe, North America and Asia.

LANCK Telecom is actively taking part in various carrier industry events including Global Carrier Community Meeting  and Capacity conferences. In 2012 LANCK Telecom has been nominated for "Best Central & Eastern European wholesale carrier" at Capacity Awards organized by TelCap Ltd., the host of the famous International Telecoms Week.

References

External links 
 Official website

Telecommunications companies of Russia